Kyle Martel is an American professional stock car racing driver. He last competed in the 2016 NASCAR Camping World Truck Series, driving the No. 59 Chevrolet Silverado for Bill Martel Racing.

Racing career

Camping World Truck Series
Martel made his Truck Series debut at Pocono in 2012, driving the No. 59 Chevrolet Silverado for his own team, Bill Martel Racing. He started 32nd and finished 21st.

Martel has raced in every Pocono race from 2012 to 2016 in the No. 59 truck. He also competed in the Homestead race in 2014.

ARCA Racing Series
Martel has also competed in a total of 17 select races from 2009 to 2014 in the ARCA Racing Series, and has finished in the top 10 twice.

Motorsports career results

NASCAR
(key) (Bold – Pole position awarded by qualifying time. Italics – Pole position earned by points standings or practice time. * – Most laps led.)

Camping World Truck Series

ARCA Racing Series
(key) (Bold – Pole position awarded by qualifying time. Italics – Pole position earned by points standings or practice time. * – Most laps led.)

 Season still in progress
 Post entry, driver and owner did not score points

References

Living people
1987 births
NASCAR drivers
Racing drivers from Pennsylvania

External links